Phormictopus is a genus of spiders in the family Theraphosidae (tarantulas) that occurs in the West Indies, mainly Cuba and Hispaniola, with three species probably misplaced in this genus found in Brazil and Argentina.

Description
They have stridulating organs on the coxae and trochanters of the pedipalps and first pair of legs. Males have two apophyses (projections) on the tibia of the first pair of legs, and urticating hairs of type I. Females have a two-part spermatheca, and urticating hairs of types I and III.

Taxonomy
The genus Phormictopus was erected by Reginald Innes Pocock in 1901. He transferred Mygale cancerides, first described by Pierre André Latreille in 1806, to his new genus as the type species. When Jan-Peter Rudloff reviewed the genus in 2008, it included 14 species. He reduced this number to seven definitely belonging to the genus, and described five more. Three species were considered misplaced in Phormictopus, but no definite alternative placement was provided. With these exclusions, the genus is probably restricted to the West Indies.

Species 
, the World Spider Catalog accepted the following species:
Phormictopus atrichomatus Schmidt, 1991 – probably Hispaniola
Phormictopus auratus Ortiz & Bertani, 2005 – Cuba
Phormictopus australis Mello-Leitão, 1941 - Argentina
Phormictopus bistriatus Rudloff, 2008 – Cuba
Phormictopus cancerides (Latreille, 1806) (type species) – Caribbean to Brazil
Phormictopus cautus (Ausserer, 1875) – Cuba
Phormictopus cochleasvorax Rudloff, 2008 – Cuba
Phormictopus cubensis Chamberlin, 1917 – Cuba
Phormictopus fritzschei Rudloff, 2008 – Cuba
Phormictopus jonai Rudloff, 2008 – Cuba
Phormictopus melodermus Chamberlin, 1917 – Hispaniola
Phormictopus platus Chamberlin, 1917 – United States or Hispaniola
Phormictopus ribeiroi Mello-Leitão, 1923 - Brazil
Phormictopus schepanskii Rudloff, 2008 – Cuba

In synonymy 
 Phormictopus cancerides centumfocensis (Franganillo, 1926) = Phormictopus cautus
 Phormictopus cancerides tenuispinus Strand, 1906 = Phormictopus cancerides
 Phormictopus dubius (Chamberlin, 1917) = Phormictopus cubensis 
 Phormictopus nesiotes Chamberlin, 1917 = Phormictopus cautus
 Phormictopus piephoi Schmidt, 2003 = Phormictopus cubensis

Nomina dubia 
Phormictopus brasiliensis Strand, 1907 - Brazil 

Phormictopus hirsutus Strand, 1907 - Venezuela

Transferred to other genera 
Phormictopus intermedius (Ausserer, 1875) → Cyrtopholis intermedia

Phormictopus multicuspidatus Mello-Leitão, 1929 → Proshapalopus multicuspidatus 

Phormictopus pheopygus Mello-Leitão, 1923 → Acanthoscurria gomesiana

References

Further reading
 

Theraphosidae
Theraphosidae genera
Spiders of the Caribbean
Spiders of South America